A mountain railway is a railway that operates in a mountainous region. It may operate through the mountains by following mountain valleys and tunneling beneath mountain passes, or it may climb a mountain to provide transport to and from the summit.

Mountain railways often use narrow gauge tracks to allow for tight curves in the track and reduce tunnel size and structure gauge, and hence construction cost and effort. Where mountain railways need to climb steep gradients, they may use steep grade railway technology, or even operate as funicular railways.

List of mountain railways

Argentina
 Mendoza to Los Andes, Chile, see Chile below

Australia 

 Glenreagh Mountain Railway
 Mt Morgan Rack Railway - abandoned in 1955.
 Skitube Alpine Railway
 West Coast Wilderness Railway

Austria

 Achensee Railway
 Arlberg Railway
 Mariazell Railway
 Pöstlingberg Railway
 Semmering Railway - A world Heritage Site
 Schafberg Railway
 Schneeberg Railway

Bolivia
 Ferrocarril de Antofagasta a Bolivia
 Ferrocarril de Arica a La Paz, Arica–La Paz
 Rio Mulatos-Potosí line

Brazil
 Corcovado Rack Railway
 São Paulo Railway

Canada

 BC Rail, crosses the Pacific Coast Range of the Coast Mountains (Garibaldi & Lillooet Ranges)
 Kicking Horse Pass
 Rogers Pass
 White Pass and Yukon Route
 Yellowhead Pass

Chile
 Ferrocarill Arica La Paz, Arica–La Paz
 Ferrocarril de Antofagasta a Bolivia
 El Ferrocarril Trasandino Los Andes - Mendoza, Los Andes - Mendoza. The rebuild will be adhesion only.

China
 Gebishi Railway
 Kunming–Hai Phong Railway
 Qingzang railway

Colombia
 Colombian Railways

Croatia
 Lika line
 Rijeka line

Eritrea
 Eritrean Railway

France
 Artouste (Petit train d')
 La Rhune (Petit train de)
 Mont Blanc Tramway
 Montenvers Railway
 Saint Gervais-Vallorcine (Ligne de)

Germany

Drachenfels Railway (Drachenfelsbahn)
 Harz Railway (Harzbahn)
Rübeland Railway (Rübelandbahn)
Harz Narrow Gauge Railways (Harzer Schmalspurbahnen)
Harz Railway (Harzquerbahn)
Brocken Railway  (Brockenbahn)
Selke Valley Railway(Selketalbahn)
Murg Valley Railway (Murgtalbahn)
 Schwarza Valley Railway (Schwarzatalbahn)
Wendelstein Railway (Wendelsteinbahn)
Bavarian Zugspitze Railway (Bayerische Zugspitzbahn)

Georgia
Borjomi-Bakuriani railway "Kukushka" (ბაკურიანი-ბორჯომი რკინიგზა)

Greece
Diakofto Kalavrita Railway

Hong Kong
Peak Tramways

India

Darjeeling Himalayan Railway - A world Heritage Site
Nilgiri Mountain Railway - A world Heritage Site
Kalka-Shimla Railway - A world Heritage Site
Matheran Hill Railway

Isle of Man
Snaefell Mountain Railway

Israel
Carmelit

Italy
Superga Rack Railway

Japan
Hakone Tozan Railway
Ikawa Line, Oigawa Railway
Kurobe Gorge Railway

Mexico
Ferrocarril de Córdoba a Huatusco

New Zealand
Rimutaka Incline Commenced operation in 1878 and ceased operation in 1955.

Norway
Flåmsbana

Peru
Empresa nacional de ferrocarriles del Peru
Ferrocarril Central Andino (Standard gauge)
Ferrocarril del sur de Peru Arequipa - Puno, (Standard gauge)
Cusco - Machu Picchu, Cusco - Machu Picchu ( gauge)

Romania

Ploiești - Brașov railway
Brașov - Sibiu - Arad railway
Râmnicu Vâlcea - Sibiu railway
Târgu Jiu - Simeria railway
Drobeta-Turnu Severin - Caransebeș railway
Oraviţa - Anina railway
Cluj-Napoca - Oradea railway
Brașov - Miercurea Ciuc - Deda railway, and Brașov - Întorsura Buzăului
Salva - Sighetul Marmatiei railway
Adjud - Siculeni railway
Suceava - Ilva Mică railway, and Vama - Moldovita
Arad - Ineu - Brad
Buzău - Nehoiașu.

Russia

Slovakia
Čierny Hron Railway

Slovenia
Bohinj railway

Spain
Montserrat Rack Railway
Vall de Núria Rack Railway

Switzerland

Appenzeller Bahnen
Bergbahn Lauterbrunnen-Mürren
Bergbahn Rheineck-Walzenhausen 
Lötschberg railway line
Berner Oberland Bahn
Brienz Rothorn Bahn
Chemin de fer Aigle-Leysin  
Chemin de fer Aigle-Ollon-Monthey-Champéry  
Chemin de fer Aigle-Sépey-Diablerets  
Chemin de fer Bex-Villars-Bretaye  
Chemins de fer electriques Veveysans 
Chemin de fer Montreux-Glion-Rochers-de-Naye
Chemin de fer Nyon-St-Cergue-Morez
Emmental-Burgdorf-Thun-Bahn
Gornergratbahn
Gotthardbahn
Jungfraubahn
Harderbahn
Matterhorn Gotthard Bahn (formerly BVZ Zermatt-Bahn, Furka Oberalp Bahn)
Monte Generoso Railway
Chemin de Fer Montreux Oberland Bernois
Pilatusbahn
Rhätische Bahn
Rigi Bahnen (Arth-Rigi-Bahn, Vitznau-Rigi-Bahn)
Rorschach-Heiden-Bahn
Schynige Platte Bahn
Transports de Martigny et Régions (Chemin de fer Martigny–Châtelard and Chemin de fer Martigny–Orsières)
Trogenerbahn
Uetlibergbahn
Wädenswil-Einsiedeln-Bahn
Wengernalpbahn
Waldenburgerbahn
Zentralbahn (former Luzern-Stans-Engelberg-Bahn, Brünigbahn)

Taiwan
 Alishan Forest Railway

United Kingdom

Brecon Mountain Railway
Cairngorm Mountain Railway
Conwy Valley line
Ffestiniog Railway
Highland Main Line
Settle–Carlisle line
Snowdon Mountain Railway
Welsh Highland Railway
West Highland Line

United States

Alamogordo and Sacramento Mountain Railway
Boca and Loyalton Railroad
Carson and Tahoe Lumber and Fluming Company
Cascade Tunnel
Cass Scenic Railroad State Park
Central Pacific Railroad
Denver and Rio Grande Western Railroad
Denver and Salt Lake Railway
Durango and Silverton Narrow Gauge Railroad
Feather River Route
Georgetown Loop Railroad
Gilpin Railroad
Lookout Mountain Incline Railway in Chattanooga, Tennessee
Manitou and Pike's Peak Railway
Michigan-California Lumber Company
Mount Lowe Railway
Mount Tom Railroad
Mount Washington Cog Railway
Mountain Division
Northwestern Pacific Railroad
Otis Elevating Railway
Raton Pass
Rio Grande Southern Railroad
San Diego and Arizona Railway
Sandy River and Rangeley Lakes Railroad
Silver City, Pinos Altos and Mogollon Railroad
Silverton Railroad
Tehachapi Loop
Uintah Railway
White Pass and Yukon Route

Venezuela
Gran Ferrocarril de Venezuela

Vietnam
Đà Lạt–Tháp Chàm Railway - Abandoned after the Vietnam War.

Mountain railways in fiction
The Culdee Fell Railway is featured in the book Mountain Engines, part of The Railway Series by Rev.W.Awdry.

See also

 Cable car (railway)
 Cable railway
 Funicular
 Hillclimbing (railway)
 List of steepest gradients on adhesion railways
 Rack railway
 Ruling gradient
 Stadler Rail (Swiss Locomotive and Machine Works)
 Steep grade railway

References

External links
Homepage of the Matterhorn-Gotthard-Bahn 
Narrow gauge railways of Switzerland 
El Ferrocarril Trasandino Los Andes – Mendoza, Argentina (Trans-Andean Railways) (all others in Spanish only)
seconstruye.com el tren Los Andes – Mendoza
Museo Ferrocarril Transandino
Ferrocarril Central Andina S.A.
Ferrocarril Central Andino S.A.
Map of central Peru Callao – Huancayo
Map of south Peru/Bolivia Machu Picchu – Lake Titicaca – west coast Pacific Ocean
Route Arequipa – Puno (Lake Titicaca)
Route Cusco – Puno (Lake Titicaca)
Route Cusco – Machu Picchu
 Homepage of the Mount Washington Cog Railway (First ever mountain climbing cog railway)

Rail transport-related lists